Mount Odin is a mountain in Qikiqtaaluk, Nunavut, Canada. Mount Odin is the highest mountain on Baffin Island.

Mount Odin is the highest mountain within the Baffin Mountains as well as the fifth-highest in the Arctic Cordillera.
Comparing absolute peaks, Mount Odin is the fifth-highest in Nunavut. The higher points in Nunavut are: Barbeau Peak on Ellesmere Island (the highest point in Nunavut at 2,616 m), two unnamed peaks on Ellesmere Island, (one at 2,347 m located at 78° 48' N, 79° 34' W and one at
2,201 m located at 80° 17' N, 75° 05' W) and Outlook Peak on Axel Heiberg Island, which at 2210 m is just 63 m higher than Mount Odin.

The mountain is named after Odin, the chief of the gods in Norse mythology and Norse paganism.

Geography
Mount Odin has an impressive rocky south face that drops into the Weasel River. To the north, the area is glaciated.

See also
 List of mountains of Canada
 List of peaks by prominence
 List of places named after Odin

References

Arctic Cordillera
Mountains of Baffin Island
Two-thousanders of Nunavut